El Valle is a Caracas Metro station on Line 3. It was opened on 18 December 1994 as the southern terminus of the inaugural section of Line 3 from Plaza Venezuela to El Valle. The station is between La Bandera and Los Jardines. On 15 October 2006 the line was extended south to La Rinconada, but the intermediate stations were only opened on 9 January 2010.

References

Caracas Metro stations
1994 establishments in Venezuela
Railway stations opened in 1994